Keven Wood (born August 21, 1984) is an American former professional stock car racing driver. He last competed part-time in the NASCAR Craftsman Truck Series, driving the No. 21 for Wood Brothers Racing. He is the cousin of Jon Wood and grandson of Glen Wood, one of the Hall of Famers in NASCAR and co-founder of Wood Brothers Racing.

Early life
Wood attended Patrick & Henry Community College in Henry County, Virginia.

Motorsports career results

NASCAR
(key) (Bold – Pole position awarded by qualifying time. Italics – Pole position earned by points standings or practice time. * – Most laps led.)

Craftsman Truck Series

References

External links
 

1984 births
NASCAR drivers
Living people
People from Stuart, Virginia
Racing drivers from Virginia
Patrick & Henry Community College alumni